Harambašić is a Croatian, Bosnian and Serbian surname, derived from harambaša – bandit leader, which may refer to:

August Harambašić (1861−1911), Croatian writer, poet, publisher, politician and translator
Stevan Harambašić, military commander in the Republic of Serbian Krajina

See also 
 Arambašić, other surname with the same meaning
 Harambašići, settlement in Bosnia and Herzegovina
 Haramija
 Korun Aramija

Bosnian surnames
Croatian surnames
Serbian surnames
Occupational surnames